Splendid China Folk Village (Chinese: 锦绣中华民俗村, pinyin: Jǐnxiù Zhōnghuá Mínsú Cūn) is a theme park including two areas (Splendid China Miniature Park & China Folk Culture Village) located in Shenzhen, Guangdong province, People's Republic of China.  The park's theme reflects the history, culture, art, ancient architecture, customs and habits of various nationalities. It is one of the world's largest scenery parks in the amount of scenarios reproduced. The park is developed and managed by the major travel and tourist corporation, China Travel Service.

Location

Splendid China is situated by the Shenzhen Bay in a tourist area of Overseas Chinese Town (OCT) in the Shenzhen Special Economic Zone. It is a 35-40 minute train ride from Luohu Station on Line 1 of the Shenzhen Metro or 30 minutes by bus (bus number 101 or mini-bus 23 are two examples).

Hours and tickets

Time: 9.00 am to 9.00 pm

Entry Closing time: 6.00 pm

1 Day ticket

Ticket Price: RMB 220

Child Ticket: RMB 90 (height 1.2 m to 1.5m)

Small kids; free (smaller than 1.2m height)

Annual Ticket

Solo Annual Ticket: RMB 360 (only 1 person can use)

Parent Annual Ticket: RMB 460 (One parent with 1 child under 1.5 m)

Family Annual Ticket: RMB 660 (Two parents with 1 child under 1.5 m)

Note: Annual Ticket prices as per February 2011. Solo as in November 2015

About the park

Over 100 major tourist attractions have been miniaturized and laid out according to the map of China. Most attractions have been reduced on a scale of 1:15. It is divided into Scenic Spot Area and Comprehensive Service Area. The entire park covers 30 hectares.

There are cars and trains to transport visitors around the park, making it possible to visit the Great Wall of China, Forbidden City, Temple of Heaven, Summer Palace, Three Gorges Dam, Potala Palace and the Terracotta Army in one day.

The park also hosts several shows depicting various events in Chinese History (e.g. a horse riding show depicting a battle led by Genghis Khan), Chinese Cultural Show, etc. Some of the shows are only performed on weekends.

Other information
Asteroid 3088 Jinxiuzhonghua was named after the park. Chinese Folk Culture Village is adjacent to the park in Shenzhen.

See also
List of parks in Shenzhen

References
 Travel China Guide article

External links

Splendid China folk culture village review
Official website Splendid China

Amusement parks in Shenzhen
Miniature parks
Nanshan District, Shenzhen